Sugar Army are a three-piece rock band from Perth, Western Australia.

History

2005–2008: Formation and Where Do You Hide Your Toys 
Sugar Army are fronted by Patrick McLaughlin and consisting of Todd Honey on lead guitar, Jamie Sher on drums and Ian Berney on bass guitar formed in 2005. 

In 2007, the band received two nominations, "Favourite Newcomer" and "Most Promising New Act", at the 2007 West Australian Music Industry Awards.  Sugar Army released its debut EP, Where Do You Hide Your Toys, through Perth label Good Cop Bad Cop (with distribution through Inertia) in February 2008, supporting Interpol in Australia that month. Where Do You Hide Your Toys was produced by Dave Parkin (Snowman, Red Jezebel) and mastered by William Bowden at King Willy Sound, the EP featured the songs, "...And Now You're Old Enough, I Think That You Should Know" and "Jigsaw", which both received radio support nationwide and earned them four nominations, "Most Popular Act", "Best Rock Act", "Best Bassist" and "Most Popular Single/EP", at the West Australian Music Industry Awards that year.

2009–2010: The Parallels Amongst Ourselves
In March 2009, "Acute" was released as the lead single from their forthcoming debut studio album. The track was featured on radio and TV nationwide and reached the top 5 in the AIR (Australian Independent Records) Independent Radio Airplay chart. They were nominated for five West Australian Music Industry Awards in 2009, "Most Popular Act", "Most Popular Music Video" "Best Rock Act", "Best Male Vocalist" and "Best Bassist", winning Best Rock Song.

Second single "Tongues in Cheeks" was released to radio in June 2009. A video for this song was co-directed by the band's drummer Jamie Sher together with Dominic Pearce, was released on 6 August 2009.

Debut album The Parallels Amongst Ourselves was released 10 July 2009 through Shock Records and debuted at #87 in the ARIA charts and #2 in the Australian Independent Record 100% Indie Charts. It also was selected as 'Album of the Week' on RTRFM and SynFM. The album was recorded by Dave Parkin and mastered by William Bowden, with the "Acute" single mastered by Greg Calbi (David Bowie, Bob Dylan, Interpol) at Sterling Sound. In August through to September 2009, the band toured Australia in support of the record.

The band's third single, "No Need for Lovers", was released in October 2009. The song is about the murder of Stacey Mitchell in Lathlain, Western Australia by two lesbian lovers  'in a fit of jealousy and sadistic pleasure'. It was the #1 played song on Triple J for the month of September 2009.

The band also appeared at the Big Day Out in 2010.

2011–2015: Summertime Heavy
Sugar Army began work on their second album following their 2009/2010 Summer festival appearances. The album recording was hindered by the departure of bass player Ian Berney in April 2011. The band, now a three-piece expanding their live show to five with the addition of two session members, completed the recording of their second album with Eric J and Scott Horscroft at BJB Studios in Sydney in July 2011, mastered by Nilesh Patel at The Exchange (UK).

First single "Hooks For Hands" was released in February 2012. Sugar Army's second album, Summertime Heavy was released on 7 September 2011.

2016–present: Beast
Sugar Army's third album, Beast was released in August 2016.

Members
 Patrick McLaughlin – vocals, guitar
 Todd Honey – guitar
 Jamie Sher – drums, bass
 Ian Berney – bass (2005–2011)

Discography

Albums

Extended plays

Awards

WAM Song of the Year
The WAM Song of the Year was formed by the  Western Australian Rock Music Industry Association Inc. (WARMIA) in 1985, with its main aim to develop and run annual awards recognising achievements within the music industry in Western Australia.

 (wins only)
|-
| 2009
| "Acute"
| Rock Song of the Year
| 
|-

References

External links
 

Western Australian musical groups
Musical groups established in 2005